Kalsian is a small village located in Sheikhupura District, Punjab, Pakistan. It is located at 32°4'0N 73°52'0E and lies about 30 km North-West of Sheikhupura city. The name Kalsian is originated from kala shiin, which was taken from the early days of its settlement by its founders. When settlers from other parts of sub-continent came to this part to lay their footprints, they had a black panther in their neighbourhood jungle and afterwards they named the place kala shiin and then it kept on changing and lastly had Kalsian in the registries of Government books. Another theory regarding the origin of the name Kalsian is that at the time of settling the forefathers found here black mud which was in Punjabi pronounced as KALI Seehn that afterwards changed to kalsian.

References

Villages in Sheikhupura District